Juan Egaña Risco (born 31 October 1769–20 April 1836) was a Chilean politician and liberal philosopher who wrote the 1823 Constitution of Chile and served as President of the Senate of Chile.

External links
 BCN Profile

1769 births
1836 deaths
Chilean people
Chilean politicians
Chilean philosophers
Presidents of the Senate of Chile